Barachel may refer to:

 Barachel, father of Elihu, in the Book of Job
 Barachel of Ammon, king of Ammon in the 670s